Tollegno is a comune (municipality) in the Province of Biella in the Italian region Piedmont, located about  northeast of Turin and about  northwest of Biella.

Tollegno borders the following municipalities: Andorno Micca, Biella, Pralungo, Sagliano Micca.

Demographic evolution

References

External links
 www.comunetollegno.it/modules/news/

Cities and towns in Piedmont